This is a list of crew to the International Space Station, in alphabetical order. Current ISS crew names are in bold. The suffix (twice, thrice, ...) refers to the individual's number of spaceflights to the ISS, not the total number of spaceflights.

This list only includes crew members of the ISS. For a list including non-crew, see List of visitors to the International Space Station.

Statistics

By nationality

By agency

A

  Joseph M. Acaba   (twice)
  Clayton C. Anderson   (twice)
  Oleg Artemyev    (twice)

B
  Michael R. Barratt   (twice)
  Kayla Barron   
  Andrei Borisenko   (twice) 
 Stephen G. Bowen   (four times)
  Kenneth D. Bowersox 
  Randolph J. Bresnik  
  Nikolai Budarin  
  Daniel C. Burbank   (thrice)
  Daniel W. Bursch

C
  Tracy E. Caldwell-Dyson   (twice)
  Josh A. Cassada  
  Christopher J. Cassidy   (twice)
  Gregory E. Chamitoff   (twice)
  Raja Chari   
  Leroy Chiao   (twice)
  Catherine G. Coleman  
  Timothy J. Creamer  
  Samantha Cristoforetti  
  Frank L. Culbertson

D
  Frank De Winne   (twice)
  Vladimir Dezhurov  
  Pyotr Dubrov

E
  Léopold Eyharts

F
Andrey Fedyaev   
  Michael Fincke   (thrice)
  Jack D. Fischer  
  Michael Foale  /
  Kevin A. Ford   (twice)
  Michael E. Fossum   (thrice)
  Satoshi Furukawa

G
  Ronald J. Garan   (twice)
  Alexander Gerst    (twice)
  Yuri Gidzenko   (twice)
  Victor J. Glover

H
  Chris A. Hadfield   (twice) 
 Nick Hague  
  Susan J. Helms   (twice)
  Robert Hines   
 Warren Hoburg  
  Michael S. Hopkins   (twice)
  Akihiko Hoshide   (thrice)

I
  Anatoli Ivanishin   (twice)

K
  Aleksandr Kaleri   (twice)
  Scott J. Kelly   (thrice)
  Anna Kikina  
  Shane Kimbrough   (thrice) 
  Christina Koch  
  Dmitri Kondratyev  
  Oleg Kononenko   (four times)  Timothy L. Kopra   (twice)
  Mikhail Korniyenko   (twice)
  Sergey Korsakov   
  Valery Korzun  
  Oleg Kotov   (thrice)
  Sergei Krikalev   (thrice)
  Sergey Kud-Sverchkov   
  André Kuipers   (twice)

L
  Kjell Lindgren  
  Yuri Lonchakov   (thrice)
  Michael E. Lopez-Alegria   (thrice)
  Edward T. Lu   (twice)

M

  Sandra H. Magnus   (thrice)
  Yuri Malenchenko   (five times)
  Nicole Aunapu Mann  
  Denis Matveev   
  Thomas H. Marshburn   (thrice)
  Richard A. Mastracchio   (four times)
  Matthias Maurer  
  K. Megan McArthur  
  William S. McArthur   (twice)
  Anne McClain  
  Jessica Meir  
  Aleksandr Misurkin  

N
  Paolo Nespoli   (twice)Sultan Al Neyadi  
  Soichi Noguchi   (thrice)
  Oleg Novitskiy   (thrice)
  Karen L. Nyberg   (twice)

O
  Takuya Onishi  
  Yuri Onufrienko  
  Aleksey Ovchinin  

P
  Gennady Padalka  (four times)
  Luca Parmitano  (twice)
  Timothy Peake  Dmitry Petelin 
  Thomas Pesquet  (twice) 
  Donald R. Pettit (three times)
  John L. Phillips (three times)Sergey Prokopyev  (twice)

R
  Garrett E. Reisman   (twice)
  Thomas Reiter  
  Sergei Revin  
  Roman Romanenko   (twice)
  Kathleen Rubins   (twice)Francisco Rubio'''  
  Sergey Ryazansky  
  Sergey Ryzhikov

S

  David Saint-Jacques  
  Aleksandr Samokutyayev   (twice)
  Yelena Serova  
  Salizhan Sharipov  
  William M. Shepherd  
  Anton Shkaplerov   (four times)
  Oleg Skripochka   (thrice)
  Aleksandr Skvortsov   (thrice)
  Nicole P. Stott   (twice)
  Maksim Surayev   (twice)
  Steven R. Swanson   (thrice)

T
  Daniel M. Tani   (twice)
  Evgeny Tarelkin  
  Robert Thirsk  
  Scott Tingle  
  Valery Tokarev   (twice)
  Sergei Treshchev  
  Mikhail Tyurin   (thrice)

U
  Yury Usachev   (twice)

V
 Ivan Vagner  
  Mark T. Vande Hei   (twice)
  Pavel Vinogradov   (twice)
  Terry W. Virts   (twice)
  Sergey Volkov   (thrice)
  James S. Voss   (twice)

W
  Koichi Wakata   (five times)
  Shannon Walker   (twice)
  Carl E. Walz  
  Jessica Watkins   
  Douglas H. Wheelock   (twice)
  Peggy A. Whitson   (thrice)
  Jeffrey N. Williams   (thrice)
  Sunita L. Williams   (twice)
  Barry E. Wilmore   (twice)
  Gregory R. Wiseman

Y
  Kimiya Yui  
  Fyodor Yurchikhin   (four times)

References

External links
 NASA Space Shuttle mission history
 NASA Major ISS events
 ESA ISS page

International Space Station visitors
International Space Station visitors